Rudolf Kaempfe (17 February 1893 – 23 December 1962) was a German general during World War II who held commands at the division and corps level.

Biography
Kaempfe fought in the First World War on the Western Front and in Serbia. 

In April 1937, he received command of the 31st Infantry Division, with which he participated in the Invasion of Poland and the Battle of France. 
In May 1941, he became the commander of the Höheres Kommando z.b.V. XXXV, later renamed as XXXV Army Corps. At the beginning of the summer of 1941, he participated with his Corps in the attack on Central Russia. On 1 July 1941, he was promoted to general of artillery. On December 19, 1941, he was awarded the German Cross in Gold. 
In autumn 1942, he gave up his command and was transferred to the Führerreserve. 

In connection with the assassination attempt on Hitler of 20 July 1944, he was arrested on 21 July 1944 by the Gestapo. When the war ended in May 1945, he was not liberated, but was taken captive by the Red Army and deported to the Soviet Union. He was released from captivity in the Autumn of 1949 and returned to Germany.

Sources
 Lexikon der wehrmacht.de
 Feldgrau

19th-century births
1962 deaths
Generals of Artillery (Wehrmacht)
German Army personnel of World War I
German Army generals of World War II
German prisoners of war in World War II held by the Soviet Union
Recipients of the Gold German Cross
Recipients of the Iron Cross (1914), 1st class